RMS Carinthia may refer to:

 , a British Cunard Line passenger ship launched in 1925 and sunk in 1940
 , a British Cunard Line passenger ship launched in 1955 and scrapped in 2006 after several changes of ownership and name

Ship names